DeWitt Parshall (1864-1956) was an American painter, based in Montecito, California since 1916. One of his paintings is held by the Metropolitan Museum of Art, though not currently on view.

References

1864 births
1956 deaths
Artists from Buffalo, New York
People from Montecito, California
American male painters
Painters from California
19th-century American painters
20th-century American painters
19th-century American male artists
20th-century American male artists